Italy competed at the 1908 Summer Olympics in London, England.  It was the third appearance of the European nation, which had not competed at the 1904 Summer Olympics. It was originally going to host the Games, but the eruption of Mount Vesuvius meant the UK hosted them.

Medalists

Results by event

Athletics

Italy's best athletics result was Emilio Lunghi's silver medal in the 800 metres.  Dorando Pietri's first-place finish in the marathon was erased by disqualification as a pair of race officials had helped him across the finish line.

Cycling

No Italian cyclist advanced to the finals in any event.  Morisetti's second-place finish in the fourth semifinal of the sprint was the best performance by an Italian cyclist.

Diving

Fencing

Gymnastics

Rowing

Swimming

Wrestling

Italy's lone wrestler in 1908 was undefeated in his four bouts, winning each match to win the gold medal in the Greco-Roman lightweight class.

References

Bibliography

External links
 Italy at the 1908 London Summer Games
 

Nations at the 1908 Summer Olympics
1908
Olympics